Zar Zari Zar Baksh, or Shah Muntajab ud din, was one of the earliest Sufis of the Chishti Order, the most dominant of all the Sufi orders in the Indian subcontinent. He was sent to the Deccan by Nizamuddin Auliya of Delhi in the beginning of the 8th century Hijri (14th century AD). With 700 disciples, Zar Zari Zar Baksh came to Aurangabad, and is said to have converted a Hindu princess near a well at Khuldabad. The place is now called the "Sohan baoli" or "pleasing well", and the princess is buried close to the saints grave in Khuldabad.

The tomb of Zar Zari Zar Baksh is between Malik Ambar's tomb and the northern gate of the town. It contains a number of ornaments and relics, the most remarkable of which is a circular steel looking glass mounted on a steel pedestal of four feet in height. It is said to have been presented by King Tana Shah. The dargah in Khuldabad attracts thousands of pilgrims each year for the Urs of the saint.

See also
 Ganj Rawan Ganj Baksh
 Khuldabad
 Khwaja Zainuddin Shirazi
 Sayyid Burhan-ud-din
 Sufi Saints of Aurangabad

References

 Gazetter of Aurangabad - H. H. The Nizam's Government 1884. (Chapter VI page 395)

External links
 aulia-e-hind
 Zar Zari Zar Baksh

People from Aurangabad, Maharashtra
Chishti Order
Indian Sufi saints
Ziyarat